Thailand first participated at the FISU World University Games (formally the Universiade until 2020) in 1985, and has sent athletes to compete in every Summer Games since then. Thailand has also participated in the Winter Games since 2007, except 2015 Games in Granada and Štrbské Pleso.

Thailand won its first medal at the 2001 Summer Games in Beijing, when the women's national volleyball team took home a bronze in the Women's Team event. Thailand's first gold medal would also come in taekwondo at the 2005 Summer Games in Izmir, when Phichet Phibunkhanrak won the Men's 72 kg event. Since then, Thai athletes have won gold medals at every subsequent Summer Games with the exception of the 2009 Games in Belgrade. 

Thailand also won its first medal in the Winter Games at the 2023 Games in Lake Placid, when the freestyle skier Paul Vieuxtemps took home a bronze in the Men's Slopestyle event.

The University Sports Board of Thailand was created and recognized by the Fédération Internationale du Sport Universitaire (FISU) in 1967.

As of 2023, Thai athletes have won a total of 113 medals in the Summer Games and another 2 in the Winter Games. Thailand's most successful Games to date were the 2007 Summer Games in Bangkok, where they won thirty medals, of which thirteen of them were gold.

Hosted Games 
Thailand has hosted the Games on one occasion.

Medal tables

Medals by Summer Games

Medals by Winter Games

Medals by Summer Sport

Medals by Winter Sport

List of medalists

See also

 Olympics
 Thailand at the Olympics
 Thailand at the Youth Olympics
 Paralympic
 Thailand at the Paralympics
 Asian Games
 Thailand at the Asian Games
 Thailand at the Asian Para Games

 Other
 Thailand at the World Games

References

External links
 
 FISU History at the FISU

 
Nations at the Universiade
Universiade
Student sport in Thailand